Gabunia is a Georgian surname. Notable people with the surname include:

Davit Gabunia (born 1982), Georgian translator, playwright, and author
Giorgi Gabunia (born 1975), Georgian journalist and host

Surnames of Georgian origin
Georgian-language surnames
Surnames of Abkhazian origin